Sanna Kämäräinen (born 8 February 1986 in Lapinlahti) is a Finnish athlete specialising in the discus throw. She finished seventh at the 2014 European Championships.

Her personal best in the event is 60.94 metres, set in Helsinki in 2014. In addition, with 54.75 metres she is the Finnish record holder in the rarely contested indoor discus throw.

Competition record

References

Finnish female discus throwers
1986 births
Living people
People from Lapinlahti
World Athletics Championships athletes for Finland
Competitors at the 2009 Summer Universiade
Competitors at the 2011 Summer Universiade
Competitors at the 2013 Summer Universiade
Sportspeople from North Savo